6 King Street  is an historic house situated on King Street in Bristol, England.

It dates from 1665, but the present early Georgian frontage dates from about 1720. It is thought that the original roof had gables, similar to those seen on the neighbouring 7 and 8, which were cut back to form the hips seen today. The interior retains many eighteenth century features.

It has been designated by English Heritage as a grade II* listed building.

References

Georgian architecture in Bristol
Grade II* listed buildings in Bristol
Grade II* listed houses
Houses in Bristol